Tyrone Henry (born October 21, 1993, in Winnipeg, Manitoba) is a Canadian ice sledge hockey player. He was a member of the silver medal-winning Canadian para ice hockey teams at the 2018 and 2022 Winter Paralympics. Henry had an interest in sledge hockey that predated the accident that disabled him.

References

External links 
 
 

1993 births
Living people
Canadian sledge hockey players
Paralympic sledge hockey players of Canada
Paralympic silver medalists for Canada
Para ice hockey players at the 2018 Winter Paralympics
Para ice hockey players at the 2022 Winter Paralympics
Medalists at the 2018 Winter Paralympics
Medalists at the 2022 Winter Paralympics
Sportspeople from Winnipeg
Paralympic medalists in sledge hockey